Earle W. Hammons, known professionally as E. W. Hammons (December 2, 1882 – July 31, 1962), was an American film producer, . He produced more than 220 films between 1921 and 1938.

Biography
Born in Winona, Mississippi, in 1882, Hammons founded Educational Pictures in 1915 with the intention of making educational films for schools. Hammons found that there was a larger market for short comedies in movie theaters, and shifted the firm's focus. Although Educational Pictures would continue to release occasional documentary shorts, its primary output was comedy.

Hammons became a highly respected film executive, and in 1938 he attempted to branch out into the lucrative feature-film market by joining forces with Grand National Pictures. The merger failed, owing to insufficient capital to operate both companies, and Hammons declared bankruptcy in 1940.

He remained a consultant to the industry, associated with documentary shorts for Paramount Pictures during World War II and with ABC-TV in the 1950s. In 1962 he died of a heart ailment, in New Rochelle, New York.

For further discussion of Hammons and his studio, see Educational Pictures and Buster Keaton.

Selected filmography

 Air Pockets (1924, with Lige Conley)
 The Iron Mule  (1925, with Al St. John, directed by Roscoe Arbuckle)
 The Movies  (1925, with Lloyd Hamilton, directed by Roscoe Arbuckle)
 Drama Deluxe (1927, with Lupino Lane, directed by Roscoe Arbuckle)
 Honeymooniacs (1929, with Monty Collins, directed by Jules White)
 The Right Bed (1929, with Edward Everett Horton)
 Honeymoon Trio (1931, with Al St. John, Walter Catlett, and Dorothy Granger, directed by Roscoe Arbuckle)
 Windy Riley Goes Hollywood (1931, with Jack Shutta and Louise Brooks, directed by Roscoe Arbuckle)
 Keep Laughing (1932)
 I Surrender Dear (1932, with Bing Crosby)
 Always Kickin' (1932, football comedy)
 The Hitch Hiker (1932, with Harry Langdon and Vernon Dent)
 Two Black Crows in Africa (1933, with Moran and Mack)
 Million Dollar Melody (1933, with Lillian Roth)
 Krakatoa (1933, narrated by Graham McNamee, produced by Joe Rock)
 Dora's Dunkin' Doughnuts (1934, with Andy Clyde and Shirley Temple)
 Hotel Anchovy (1934, with The Ritz Brothers, directed by Al Christie)
 Going Spanish (1934, with Bob Hope)
 Three Cheers for Love (1934, with Sylvia Froos and Warren Hull)
 Grooms in Gloom (1935, with Tom Howard and George Shelton)
 Hail, Brother (1935, with Billy Gilbert and Shemp Howard)
 Dumb Luck (1935, with the Easy Aces)
 Mr. Widget  (1935, with Joe Cook)
 Way Up Thar  (1935, with Joan Davis, directed by Mack Sennett)
 Blue Blazes (1936, with Buster Keaton)
 Grand Slam Opera (1936, with Buster Keaton)
 Playboy Number One (1937, with Willie Howard)
 Montague the Magnificent (1937, with Bert Lahr)
 The Bashful Ballerina (1937, with Imogene Coca)
 Dates and Nuts (1937, with Herman Timberg, Jr. and Pat Rooney, Jr., and June Allyson)
 Getting an Eyeful (1938, with Danny Kaye)
 All's Fair (1938, with The Cabin Kids)
 Col. Stoopnagle's Cavalcade of Stuff #2  (1939, the final Educational comedy)

References

External links

List of films made by Educational Pictures from IMDB

1882 births
1962 deaths
Film producers from New York (state)
Educational Pictures
People from Winona, Mississippi
Businesspeople from New Rochelle, New York
20th-century American businesspeople